Burkhard Gantenbein (14 July 1912 – 27 August 2007) was a Swiss field handball player who competed in the 1936 Summer Olympics. He was part of the Swiss field handball team, which won the bronze medal. He played two matches.

References

External links
profile

1912 births
2007 deaths
Field handball players at the 1936 Summer Olympics
Olympic bronze medalists for Switzerland
Olympic handball players of Switzerland
Swiss male handball players
Olympic medalists in handball
Medalists at the 1936 Summer Olympics